Chand Tara Kumari is a Nepali politician and a member of the House of Representatives of the federal parliament of Nepal. She is also a member of the International Committee of the House.

References

Living people
Nepal MPs 2017–2022
Communist Party of Nepal (Maoist Centre) politicians
Terai Madhesh Loktantrik Party politicians
Madhesi Jana Adhikar Forum, Nepal politicians
1968 births